Gandhi Sagar Sanctuary is a wildlife sanctuary situated on the northern boundary of Mandsaur and Nimach districts in Madhya Pradesh, India. It is spread over an area of  adjoining Rajasthan state in India. It was notified in 1974 and more area was added in 1983. The Chambal River passes through the sanctuary dividing it into two parts. The western part is in Nimach district and eastern part is in Mandsaur district. It is in the Khathiar-Gir dry deciduous forests ecoregion.

Flora and fauna
The Sanctuary is open throughout the year. With a varied terrain of wooded hills – the forest being dry, mixed and deciduous- and flat grasslands around Gandhi sagar dam submergence, it offers abundant opportunities of sighting a variety of wildlife. The principal tree species found in the Sanctuary are Khair (Acacia catechu), Salai, Kardhai, Dhawda, Tendu, Palash etc.

The predominant animal species that inhabit the sanctuary are the deer, of which the most easily sighted are the chinkara or Indian gazelle, Nilgai and sambar. In addition the Indian leopard, langur, Indian wild dog, peacock, otter, and Mugger crocodile are present.

Places archaeological and religious importance

Sanctuary has many places of historical, archaeological and religious importance. These are Chaurasigarh, Chaturbhujnath temple, Bhadkaji rock paintings, Narsinghjhar, Hinglajgarh Fort, Taxakeshwar temple etc.

 Chaturbhujnath temple, dedicated to Vishnu, is located about 8 km from Gandhi sagar dam site
 Hinglajgarh or Hinglaj Fort is an ancient fort situated near village Navali in Bhanpura tehsil of Mandsaur district in Madhya Pradesh
 Taxakeshwar temple  or Takhaji is a place of religious and historical importance in Mandsaur district
The museum depicting the popular arts of Mandsaur
 Dharmrajeshwar is an ancient Buddhist and Hindu cave temple site of 4th-5th Century in Mandsaur

See also
 Central India
 Tourism in Madhya Pradesh

References

Buddhist caves in India
Buddhist temples in India
Khathiar-Gir dry deciduous forests
Tourist attractions in Mandsaur district
Wildlife sanctuaries in Madhya Pradesh
1974 establishments in Madhya Pradesh
Protected areas established in 1974